Filipe Clemente de Souza (born 26 October 1976) is a Macanese race driver.

He has competed in the Macau Hotel Fortuna Trophy from 2000 to 2003 with a best finish of fourth in 2003. Since 2003 he has been competing in the Macau Touring Car Championship with a best placing of third in 2009. In 2011 he will compete in the World Touring Car Championship driving for Corsa Motorsport.

Career results

Complete World Touring Car Championship results
(key) (Races in bold indicate pole position) (Races in italics indicate fastest lap)

‡ Half points awarded as less than 75% of race distance was completed.

Complete TCR Asia Series results
(key) (Races in bold indicate pole position) (Races in italics indicate fastest lap)

Complete TCR International Series results
(key) (Races in bold indicate pole position) (Races in italics indicate fastest lap)

Complete World Touring Car Cup results
(key) (Races in bold indicate pole position) (Races in italics indicate fastest lap)

TCR Spa 500 results

References

 WTCC Profile
 Corsa Motorsport Website

Living people
1976 births
Macanese people
Macau racing drivers
World Touring Car Championship drivers
TCR International Series drivers
TCR Asia Series drivers
World Touring Car Cup drivers
Engstler Motorsport drivers